United States women's national floorball team is the national team of the United States.  At the 2003 Floorball Women's World Championship in Germany, the team finished sixth in the B-Division.  At the 2005 Floorball Women's World Championship in Singapore, the team finished second in the B-Division. At the 2007 Floorball Women's World Championship in Frederikshavn, Denmark, the team finished ninth in the A-Division.

Roster

Team staff 
 Head coach – Ann Jumppannen
 Assistant coach – Geri Lindberg
 Assistant coach – Marcel Kratochvil
 Team Manager – Ann Lövgren

References 

Women's national floorball teams
Floorball